Zawar is a settlement located in Udaipur district, Rajasthan, India, approximately 40 km from the lake city Udaipur. It stretches some 10 kilometers along the banks of the Gomati River. It is close to Dhebar Lake, India's second largest artificial lake , after Govind Ballabh Pant Sagar dam). it is one of the oldest zinc mines of the world. It is declared as the National Geological Monument.

Zawar is a township created by mining company Hindustan Zinc Limited, for extraction of zinc and lead. An 80MW power plant provides electricity for mining zinc and lead from three major mines.

There is also a large football stadium which annually hosts a national soccer tournament in January. The tournament is named after the late Mr. Mohan Kumar Manglam. A five-day Mela, which starts four days before Dashehra, is organised here. Dashehra is celebrated by burning a big 'Ravan's dummy', which entertains a crowd of thousands from nearby towns.

Zawar is in a mountainous region. It features a rock garden, and five centrally-located temples. Zawar is systematically divided into colonies and Hindustan Zinc Ltd has provided a guest house, a community centre and a club.

List of lakes in India
List of lakes in India

References

Cities and towns in Udaipur district
Zinc mines in India
Mining in Rajasthan
National Geological Monuments in India
Lead mines